Ponnampet is a town which is also the taluk headquarters of Ponnampet taluk which is in the southern part of the district of Kodagu in the state of Karnataka.Ponnampet taluk came into existence on 29 November 2020.

It was originally named after Diwan Cheppudira Ponnappa as Ponnapett. It was established in the year 1821 in the name of the Late Diwan under the regime of Kodagu Rajas.

The town was called notified area in the period of British and later on it was converted into a Municipality and now it is known as 1st Grade Village Panchayath. Ponnampet was a Taluk Headquarters during Pre-Independence Period and continues up to the re-organisation of states after independence.

It has a population of 6,473 according to 2011 census. A college of forestry formerly a part of the University of Agricultural Sciences, Bangalore, now with the University of Agricultural and Horticultural Sciences, Shimoga is located here. A hill known as Kundah overlooks the town.

Administration and Government 

Major Government offices here are:
 Ponnampet Taluk Panchayath Office (Executive Officer)
 Civil Court
 Sub Treasury
 Sub Registrars Office
 Horticulture Office
 Women and Child Welfare Office
 Village Panchayath Office
 Nad Office (Deputy Thasildhar Office)
 Range Forest Office
 PWD Office
 CESCOM office
 Post Office

Landmarks 

 Various Banks like DCC Bank, SBI, Canara Bank, Igguthappa Souhardha Bank, Town Cop Bank, APCMS, Corporation Bank, Primary Agriculture and Credit Co-op bank, APCMS. 
 Sports Facilities like Astro Turf Ground, Sports School
 Inspection Bungalow
 Kodava Samaj
 Veterinary Hospital
 Ramakrishna Sharada Seva Ashram Hospital 
 Agriculture Research Centre
 BSNL Office - Telephone Exchange
 Mahila Co-op Society
 Police Station
 Swami Vivekananda Ashram Hospital

In addition to this within 5 kilometres the Gonikoppal town in which Krishi Vigyan Kendra (KVK), Cauvery degree college, Coffee Board Research Centre, many schools and college, a circle inspector office, KEB - AEE office are also located here.

Education 

 Appachakavi Vidyalaya
 St. Antonys school
 Sai Shankar Institutions
 Govt Junior College
 Industrial Training Institute (ITI)
 PU and Degree Colleges
 B.Ed College
 Social Welfare Office - Hostels (Boys and Girls)
 Coorg Institute of Technology
 College of Forestry

Notes

Cities and towns in Kodagu district